Lundborg is a surname. Notable people with the surname include:

Einar Lundborg (1896–1931), Swedish aviator
Florence Lundborg (1871–1949), American artist
Herman Bernhard Lundborg (1868–1943), Swedish physician
Patrick Lundborg (1967–2014), writer on pop culture and author of the book The Acid Archives

See also
Unverricht–Lundborg disease (abbreviated ULD or EPM1), the most common form of progressive myoclonic epilepsy